Valeriy Nikolayevich Yablochkin (born 2 February 1973 in Temirtau) is a retired football forward from Kazakhstan. He obtained a total number of two caps for the Kazakhstan national football team during his career, scoring one goal.

References 

1973 births
People from Temirtau
Living people
Association football forwards
Soviet footballers
FC Vostok players
Kazakhstani footballers
FC Shakhter Karagandy players
Kazakhstan international footballers
FC Kairat players
FC Shinnik Yaroslavl players
Kazakhstani expatriate footballers
Expatriate footballers in Russia
FC Lokomotiv Moscow players
Russian Premier League players